Galatasaray Men's Water Polo Team is the water polo team of the Turkish sports club Galatasaray S.K.

History
In the 1910s, water polo began to be played for the first time in Istanbul by Galatasaray fans.

Water polo, which became a branch in Bebek Facilities, continued its struggle for many years in Galatasaray Kuruçeşme Island. With the opening of the pool in Kalamış in 1968, it took its place in the water sports center.

In the Turkish Away Water Polo League, which started in the 1950s, it won the championship twice, in 1955 and 1957, and three times, 73, 75 and 77, for a long time in the 1970s. It was suspended for 14 years until 1991.

With the arrival of Hungarian coach Zoltan Gulyas in 1988, importance was given to infrastructure works, and it started to become a branch that tries to train Olympic athletes instead of a branch that makes the children of its members do sports.

In 2011, Galatasaray Men's Water Polo Team won Turkish Water Polo Championship Cup.

Domestic Success

Türkiye Sutopu Şampiyonası:
Winners (9): 1931, 1932, 1933, 1934, 1935, 1936, 1937, 1938, 1939
Türkiye Sutopu 1. Ligi:
Winners (27): 1955, 1957, 1973, 1975, 1977, 1991, 1993, 1994, 1995, 1996, 1997, 1999, 2000, 2001, 2003, 2005, 2006, 2007, 2008, 2009, 2010, 2011, 2012, 2013, 2014, 2015, 2017

International Success
 LEN Champions League:
 Quarter-Finals (1): 2012-2013

Current squad

References

External links
Galatasaray SK Official Web Site 
Galatasaray SK - Water Polo - Global Sports Archive 

Water polo clubs in Turkey
1910 establishments in the Ottoman Empire
Galatasaray S.K. (men's water polo)